Kim Chol-man (김철만; 2 November 1918 – 3 December 2018) was a North Korean politician and military official. He was a member of several important committees and organizations, including the 6th Central Military Commission, the 6th Politburo, and the Second Economic Committee. He was at the forefront of the North Korean munitions industry, the country's economic base (see Songun). In old age Kim was no longer considered a major player in North Korean politics, having retired from most of his important posts.

Early life and education
Kim was born in 1918 in South Pyongan Province. He is the brother-in-law of Han Tok-su, former chairman of the General Association of Korean Residents in Japan.

He was trained at the Frunze Military Academy in the Soviet Union, then known as the RKKA Military Academy.

Military career
Kim joined Kim Il-sung's United Army in 1937 along with other first-generation  guerrilla leaders such as Ri Ul-sol and Kim Ik-hyon. 

Kim saw action in the Korean War and suffered physical wounds.

Kim also held many para-military posts. In 1964, he became the Director-General of the Strategy Bureau in the Ministry of People's Security. During this time, he was a central figure in the establishment of a unitary leadership and a collective principle system in North Korea, along with Kim Jong-il. In October 1980 he was appointed a member of the powerful 6th Central Military Commission of the Workers' Party of Korea. In September 1998 he became a member of the National Defense Commission. Kim led North Korea's munitions industry, the country's economic base, along with Korean Workers' Party Secretary Jon Pyong-ho.

Political career
In November 1967, as a member of the first generation of North Korean leadership, Kim was elected as an alternate member to the 6th Central Committee of the Korean Workers' Party. He was elevated to full member status in November 1970. Kim's position was placed in danger following a 1969 purge of military officials, but survived untouched. For a short period of time (October 1980 – September 1981) Kim was an alternate member of the Politburo of the Workers' Party of Korea, the highest decision-making body of North Korea.

Special positions he held include the Chair of the Second Economic Committee, and the funeral committees of both Kim Il-sung and O Jin-u. The funeral committees are often seen as an indicator of de facto power.

In old age, Kim was retired from many of his positions. During a reshuffle in 2003, which saw the removal of other members of the first generation of North Korean leadership such as Ri Ul-sol, Kim was retired from the Second Economic Committee and the National Defense Commission. He held on to membership in the Central Military Committee until September 2010.

He was a delegate deputy to the 5th, 6th, 8th, 9th, 10th, 11th, and 12th Supreme People's Assemblies.

Awards
Kim was the recipient of the Hero of the Republic and Double Hero awards in 1968 and 1992 respectively.

Death 
Kim Chol-man died of bladder cancer on 3 December 2018 at the age of 98. His funeral committee was chaired by Kim Jong-un and was composed of the following members:

 Kim Jong-un
 Choe Ryong-hae
 Pak Pong-ju
 Yang Hyong-sop
 Ri Myong-su
 Ri Su-yong
 Kim Phyong-hae
 Thae Jong-su
 O Su-yong
 An Jong-su
 Kim Yong-chol
 Choe Pu-il
 Ro Tu-chol
 Choe Hwi
 Pak Thae-dok
 Kim Su-gil
 Ri Yong-gil
 No Kwang-chol
 Jong Kyong-thaek
 Im Chol-ung
 Jo Yon-jun
 Ri Man-gon
 Ri Pyong-chol
 Kim Nung-o
 Kim Tok-hun
 
 Ri Ryong-nam
 Tong Jong-ho
 Jon Kwang-ho
 
 Kim Yong-dae
 Hwang Sun-hui
 Pak Kyong-suk
 Ri Yong-suk
 Ri Il-hwan
 Ri Chol-man
 
 Ri Yong-rae
 Ryang Won-ho
 Pak To-chun
 Hong Sung-mu
 Hong Yong-chil
 Yu Jin
 Kang Pong-hun
 Kim Tu-il
 Mun Kyong-dok
 
 Ryang Jong-hun
 Kim Jae-ryong
 Pak Jong-nam
 Ri Hi-yong
 Kim Song-il
 
 
 
 
 
 
 
 
 Jo Jun-mo
 So Hong-chan
 
 Jo Kyong-chol
 
 Yun Tong-hyon
 Kim Song-chol
 Ho Yong-chun
 Kim Hyong-ryong
 Ri Yong-ju
 O Kum-chol

References

1918 births
2018 deaths
Frunze Military Academy alumni
North Korean generals
North Korean military personnel of the Korean War
Deaths from bladder cancer
Deaths from cancer in North Korea
Members of the 6th Politburo of the Workers' Party of Korea
Alternate members of the 6th Politburo of the Workers' Party of Korea
Members of the 5th Central Committee of the Workers' Party of Korea
Members of the 6th Central Committee of the Workers' Party of Korea
People of 88th Separate Rifle Brigade